Benjamin John Strevens (born 24 May 1980) is an English former professional footballer and manager who played as a striker or an attacking midfielder. He is currently the manager of National League club Dagenham & Redbridge.

Playing career
Strevens began his career at Wingate & Finchley and in the 1998–99 season in the Isthmian League Division Three he scored 28 league goals coming joint second in the top scorers chart, helping the side to promotion. He was then signed by Barnet, having scored 38 goals in 67 appearances for the Blues.

He was then loaned out to Slough Town and then to St Albans City, before becoming a regular first team player for the Bees. He made 41 appearances in 2005–06 season for Barnet, by which point he was their longest serving player, but left the club at the end of the season, having scored 42 career goals for the club.

He was the only player in the Barnet squad to be relegated to the Conference National in 2000–01 season, and then be re-promoted back into the Football League in 2004–05. He was picked up on free transfer by Crawley Town and scored his first goal for the club on his debut against Rushden & Diamonds.

Strevens suffered a fractured cheek bone and damaged eye socket in Crawley's 3–2 defeat to Lewes in an FA Cup game in 2006.

He signed for Dagenham & Redbridge in December 2006, whom he was promoted with at the end of the 2006–07 season into League Two. At the end of the 2008–09 season he signed for Brentford, along with Dagenham teammates Danny Foster and Sam Saunders. He joined Wycombe Wanderers in 2010, helping them to win promotion to League One in his first season, only to be relegated back to League Two the following year. Strevens was then released by Wycombe in May 2012. On 20 July 2012, Strevens signed a one-year deal at League Two club Gillingham. He made his debut in a League Cup game on 14 August 2012, scoring his first professional goal for the club. His first league goal came on 10 November away at Plymouth Argyle.

After being made available for a free transfer from Gillingham by Martin Allen in January 2013, Strevens signed for Dagenham & Redbridge on the January 2013 transfer deadline day. On 7 May 2013, he was released by the Daggers due to the expiry of his contract and joined Conference South club Eastleigh. Strevens played an integral part in Eastleigh's championship winning team in his first year at the club and their first season at Conference Premier level.

He worked as player/assistant-manager under Chris Todd during the latter stages of the 2015–16 season and was caretaker manager for one National League match at Wrexham in August 2016, following Todd's departure and his replacement by Ronnie Moore. Despite signing a further extension to his contract at the start of the 2016–17 season, Strevens left Eastleigh by mutual agreement in September 2016 to re-join his former manager Richard Hill at National League South club Whitehawk.

After Hill left in November to join Aston Villa as a scout, Strevens was appointed temporary player/joint manager. His first game in joint charge ended in a 4–4 draw, with Strevens having a last minute penalty saved by Gosport Borough defender Brett Poate, who had taken over in goal with his keeper off injured. After two more games, Strevens returned to Eastleigh.

Managerial career
On 5 November 2018, Strevens was appointed as permanent manager of Eastleigh after a spell as caretaker manager.

On 26 January 2022, Strevens left the club by mutual consent with the club sitting in 14th place. His last match in charge was a 1–0 defeat to Dover Athletic, the opposition's first victory in 364 days.

On 10 March 2023, Strevens was appointed manager of his former club Dagenham & Redbridge.

Career statistics

Managerial statistics

Honours
Conference National: 2004–05, 2006–07
League Two: 2012–13

References

External links

1980 births
Living people
Footballers from Edgware
English footballers
Association football midfielders
Wingate & Finchley F.C. players
Barnet F.C. players
Slough Town F.C. players
St Albans City F.C. players
Crawley Town F.C. players
Dagenham & Redbridge F.C. players
Brentford F.C. players
Wycombe Wanderers F.C. players
Gillingham F.C. players
Eastleigh F.C. players
Whitehawk F.C. players
English Football League players
Isthmian League players
National League (English football) players
English football managers
Eastleigh F.C. managers
Whitehawk F.C. managers
Dagenham & Redbridge F.C. managers
National League (English football) managers